Sabaskong Bay 32C is a First Nations reserve on Lake of the Woods in Ontario. It is one of the reserves of the Naotkamegwanning First Nation.

References

External links
 Canada Lands Survey System

Saulteaux reserves in Ontario
Communities in Rainy River District